Bisichi Plc is a mining and property corporation listed on the London Stock Exchange. It was founded in 1910. It operates the Black Wattle coal mine in Middelburg, Mpumalanga, South Africa. Its retail property investments are managed by London & Associated Properties.

References

External links
 

Mining companies based in London
Property companies based in London
Non-renewable resource companies established in 1910
Companies based in the City of Westminster
Mayfair
Companies listed on the London Stock Exchange
Coal companies of England
1910 establishments in England